The Second Kidston Ministry was the 25th ministry of the Government of Queensland and was led by Premier William Kidston. It succeeded the Second Philp Ministry on 18 February 1908, 13 days after the 1908 state election. The ministry was followed by the Denham Ministry on 7 February 1911 following Kidston's retirement from politics.

At first the ministry represented only his own "Kidstonites" party, but from October 1908 reflected a merger of that party with Robert Philp's conservative party as Kidston had concluded that co-operation with the Labour Party was no longer possible.

First ministry

On 18 February 1908 the Governor, the Rt Hon Viscount Chelmsford, designated eight principal executive offices of the Government, and appointed the following Members of the Parliament of Queensland to the Ministry as follows:

Second ministry
Following the merger of the Kidston and Philp parties, a new ministry was formed on 29 October 1908.

Third ministry
Another major reshuffle took place on 22 June 1909. One junior minister, George Jackson, subsequently lost his parliamentary seat at the 1909 state election, necessitating the reshuffle of his portfolios on 22 October 1909.

References
 
 
 
 
 

Queensland ministries